National Science Library is a national library of Ukraine in the city of Lviv, Ukraine. It also serves as a science and research institute complex of the National Academy of Sciences of Ukraine. 

The library formally was established on 2 January 1940 with its headquarters in the building of Ossolineum and composed of holdings of Ossolineum and many other major libraries and private collections, all nationalized after the territory was annexed by the Soviet Union as a result of its invasion of Poland. It was named after Vasyl Stefanyk in 1971.

To the development of the library greatly contributed Ukrainian archaeologist Larysa Krushelnytska who was appointed as its head in October 1991.

See also
 Ossolineum

References

External links
 Stefanyk National Science Library website

Institutes of the National Academy of Sciences of Ukraine
NASU department of history, philosophy and law
Universities and colleges in Lviv
1940 establishments in Ukraine
Libraries established in 1940
Academic libraries in Ukraine
Ukraine, Lviv
Deposit libraries
Libraries in Lviv
National Academy of Sciences of Ukraine
Science libraries
National libraries in Ukraine
Institutions with the title of National in Ukraine